903 Peachtree is a high-rise residential building that is currently under construction in Atlanta, Georgia, United States. Proposed by CA Ventures in 2018, the building would rise 32 stories at the intersection of Peachtree Street and Eighth Street in Midtown Atlanta. Solomon Cordwell Buenz will serve as the building's architect.

History 
Chicago-based company CA Ventures proposed the building in October 2018. The initial design called for eight levels of "podium parking" with 549 spaces, above which would be 23 stories of residential spaces housing 417 units. Additionally, the building would hold  of street-level retail space. Plans for the building were presented before the Midtown Development Review Committee that month, with the committee requesting some alterations to the proposal. In March 2019, the company filed for land development permits to begin construction by demolishing several small preexisting buildings on the site. Around this time, the developers clarified that the residential units would be market rate apartments and not condominiums. By December 2019, these permits were still waiting for review by the city, with no firm construction schedule in place at that time. However, by March 2020, CA Ventures secured a $101 million construction loan for the site, and the buildings at the site were demolished the following month. In May, Solomon Cordwell Buenz was announced as the building's architect.

On January 18, 2022, CA Ventures announced that the building had topped out at its maximum height of 33 floors.

References

External links 
 

Buildings and structures in Atlanta
Buildings and structures under construction in the United States
Midtown Atlanta
Proposed buildings and structures in Georgia (U.S. state)